Valerio Nati (born April 11, 1956 in Dovadola, Italy) is a former Italian professional boxer.

Professional career 

Nati turned professional in 1978 under the management of Giorgio Bonetti. He won the Italian bantamweight title from Giuseppe Fossati in his 11th fight in 1979, and the vacant European Bantamweight title in a bout against Juan Francisco Rodríguez the following year.

Between 1981 and 1982, Nati defended his title five times in matches against Vicente Rodriguez, John Feeney, Jean-Jacques Souris, Luis De La Sagra, and Esteban Eguia.  However, he struggled to get down to 118 lbs. for his fight with Fossati in 1982 and lost the title to his rival. A rematch with Fossati the following year was fought to a draw.

In 1983, Nati lost two matches for the European Boxing Union Featherweight title.  The following year, Bonetti retired and Nati chose Umberto Branchini as his new manager. Between 1984 and 1987 Nati racked up 14 consecutive victories to get another shot at the European Featherweight title, which he won against Marc Amand in two rounds. After six more victories, he had a World Boxing Council Super Bantamweight title opportunity against Daniel Zaragoza, but was knocked out in the 5th round. He rebounded from the loss, challenging World Boxing Organization Super Bantamweight champion Kenny Mitchell and winning by disqualification. However, Nati lost his first defense of the WBO title to Puerto Rican Orlando Fernandez, and eventually retired in 1991. From 2012 to 2014 he was a part of the World Series of Boxing Dolce & Gabbana Milano Thunder team that won the 2011–2012 World Championship in London.

See also
List of super-bantamweight boxing champions

External links

1956 births
Living people
Italian male boxers
Bantamweight boxers
Super-bantamweight boxers
featherweight boxers
World super-bantamweight boxing champions
World Boxing Organization champions